C.D. Hylton Senior High School, commonly known as C.D. Hylton or Hylton High School, is a public high school located in Dale City in Prince William County, Virginia, United States, and part of the Prince William County Public Schools division.

The school is named after real estate developer Cecil D. Hylton, who built thousands of homes in Dale City, Virginia and surrounding areas. Cecil D. Hylton donated the land that the school grounds are currently using.

In 2011, Mrs. Carolyn Custard (former Hylton High School principal) became the Director of Student Services for Prince William County Public Schools.

In May 2007, Newsweek Magazine ranked Hylton High School, 298th in the nation on its annual list of "Best High Schools in America."

Hylton High School is also home of the Irene V. Hylton Planetarium (named after Cecil's D. Hylton's wife).  The planetarium offers shows to all 100 Prince William County Schools during the day as well as public offerings in the evenings and private shows by appointment.  The Planetarium Director is Mr. Tony Kilgore.

Demographics

In the 2017-2018 school year, Hylton's student body was:
27.2% Black/African American
38.3% Hispanic 
19.1% White
8.3% Asian
6.5% Two or More Races
.5% American Indian/Alaskan
.1% Hawaiian/Pacific Islander

Test scores
Hylton High School is a fully accredited school based on its performance on the Virginia Standards of Learning tests. The average SAT score in 2015 was 1454 (out of 2400).

Athletics
In 2013 Michael Alison Chandler of The Washington Post wrote that C.D. Hylton High "is considered a football powerhouse."

Notable alumni
Tommy Adams – Former Basketball Guard; 2002 MEAC Player of the Year at Hampton University
Alec Bettinger - MLB Pitcher for the Milwaukee Brewers
Ahmad Brooks – Linebacker, San Francisco 49ers
Brandon Brown - NASCAR driver
Deon Butler – Wide Receiver, Seattle Seahawks
Grover Gibson – Kickers Emden Germany Pro Soccer
Ali Krieger – Professional Soccer player; Orlando Pride, United States Women's National Soccer Team, 2015 FIFA Women's World Cup champion, U.S. Olympian
Darius Reynolds – football player
Andre Scrubb – MLB pitcher for the Houston Astros
David Stokes – Former D.C. United player (MLS), former Carolina RailHawks player (USL), current coach at Patriot High School (Prince William County)
Amy Tong – 2000 U.S. Olympian, Judo −78 kg

Specialty programs
CISL (pronounced "sizzle") is the Center for International Studies and Languages at Hylton High School, founded by Margaret Holt. The CISL program includes:
 A series of courses that emphasize an appreciation and understanding of world languages, world cultures, and global issues 
 Selected extracurricular programs and community service activities promoting international awareness and global communication 
 An exit interview demonstrating a working knowledge of a world language 
 An interdisciplinary research paper conducted as an independent project through the AP Comparative Government class

References

Educational institutions established in 1991
Public high schools in Virginia
Schools in Prince William County, Virginia
Northern Virginia Scholastic Hockey League teams
1991 establishments in Virginia